Martin James may refer to:

 Martin James (footballer) (born 1971), English former professional football player
 Martin James (cricketer) (born 1963), former English cricketer
 Martin S. James (1920–2011), English-American art historian

See also
 Marty James, American musician